Rong Hao (born 7 April 1987) is a Chinese professional footballer who currently plays for Chinese Super League club Guangzhou F.C. as a right-footed left-back.

Club career
Rong Hao started his football career with Wuhan Guanggu in 2006, making his debut and scoring his first goal for the club on 27 May 2006 in a 1-0 win against Shenyang Ginde. He then played in five more league games at the end of the 2006 season. By the following season, he began to gradually establish himself as a regular for the club despite usually coming on as a substitute; however, Wuhan were suddenly ejected from the top tier and subsequently relegated during the 2008 season after the club's management refused to accept the punishment given to them by the Chinese Football Association after a scuffle broke out on 27 September 2008 in a 1-1 draw against Beijing Guoan. Rong then found himself unable to play any football without a club.

In the 2009 season, newly promoted club Jiangsu Sainty were willing to take Rong on loan. He immediately established himself as the regular for the club and helped guide them to a tenth-place position. Once his loan ended, Rong transferred to fellow top tier side Hangzhou Greentown and helped guide the club to a fourth-place finish, allowing them to play in the AFC Champions League for the first time in the club's history.

On 26 December 2011, Rong transferred to Guangzhou Evergrande along with Zhao Xuri, Li Jianbin and Peng Xinli. Rong was injured for most of the 2012 season and was in no condition to take part in any matches. He won 13 major trophies during his 6-year stay in his first spell for Guangzhou, including 6 Chinese Super League and 2 AFC Champions League titles. On 28 February 2018, Rong was loaned to fellow top tier side Shanghai Shenhua for the 2018 season. On 28 February 2019, Rong was loaned out to fellow top tier side Tianjin Teda for the 2019 season. On 12 April 2021, Rong joined homwtown club Wuhan Three Towns, where he won the 2021 China League One and achieved promotion to the Chinese Super League with the team.  On 13 February 2022, Rong returned to newly-promoted Zhejiang Pro (formerly named Hangzhou Greentown) after 11 years, and he expressed the intention to retire at the club.  However, due to personal and family reasons, he only played 1 game for Zhejiang during his second spell. On 27 August 2022, Rong returned to Guangzhou F.C. (formerly named Guangzhou Evergrande) after terminating his contract with Zhejiang, stating that he is willing to play for them for free in order to save the club from its financially troubled state.  However he was not able to prevent the club's relegation from the 2022 Chinese Super League.

International career
Rong made his international debut on 1 June 2009 in a 1-0 friendly win against Iran at Qinhuangdao. After several further friendlies, he then established himself as the first-choice left back under then manager Gao Hongbo and won the 2010 East Asian Football Championship with the national team before being called up to China's squad for the 2011 AFC Asian Cup.

Career statistics

Club statistics
.

International statistics

Honours

Club
Guangzhou Evergrande
Chinese Super League: 2012, 2013, 2014, 2015, 2016, 2017
AFC Champions League: 2013, 2015
Chinese FA Cup: 2012, 2016
Chinese FA Super Cup: 2016, 2017, 2018

Wuhan Three Towns
China League One: 2021

International
China PR national football team
East Asian Football Championship: 2010

References

External links
 
 
 Player stats at Sohu.com

1987 births
Living people
Footballers from Wuhan
Chinese footballers
China international footballers
Wuhan Guanggu players
Jiangsu F.C. players
Zhejiang Professional F.C. players
Guangzhou F.C. players
Shanghai Shenhua F.C. players
Tianjin Jinmen Tiger F.C. players
Wuhan Three Towns F.C. players
Chinese Super League players
China League One players
2011 AFC Asian Cup players
Association football fullbacks